Sialidase-1, is a mammalian lysosomal neuraminidase enzyme which in humans is encoded by the NEU1 gene.

Function 

The protein encoded by this gene encodes the lysosomal enzyme, which cleaves terminal sialic acid residues from substrates such as glycoproteins and glycolipids. In the lysosome, this enzyme is part of a heterotrimeric complex together with beta-galactosidase and cathepsin A (the latter also referred to as 'protective protein'). Mutations in this gene can lead to sialidosis.

Clinical significance 

Mutations in NEU1 leads to sialidosis, a rare lysosomal storage disease. Sialidase has also been shown to enhance recovery from spinal cord contusion injury when injected in rats.

Interactions 

NEU1 has been shown to interact with Cathepsin A.

References

Further reading 

 
 
 
 
 
 
  * 
 
 
 
 
 
 
 
  * 
 
 

Human proteins